Sangan Zarbin Cupressus is a 3,212-year-old cypress tree located in Sistan and Baluchestan province, 45 km from Khash city with a height of about 30 meters and a trunk diameter of 3 meters. This cypress tree is registered as one of the national natural monuments of Iran  and the life of it is estimated to be about 2000 years.

Cypress trees were sacred to Zoroastrians and were mostly planted by Mobads (Zoroastrian priests). For this reason, after Islam, the people of the region, in order not to destroy this tree, called it the Mir Omar tree, and later it was named Sol. In the past, people used this tree as a shrine and a place to seek their desires.

See also 

 Cypress of Kashmar

 Sarv-e Abarkuh- An old tree in the city of Abarkuh,Yazd, which is estimated to be nearly 4,000 years old.

 Rahmat tree- An old sycamore tree in the city of Kermanshah, which is estimated to be more than 700 years old.

Reference 

Nature conservation in Iran
Environment of Iran
Individual trees in Iran